Heffler is a surname. Notable people with the surname include:

Norbert Heffler (born 1990), Hungarian footballer, brother of Tibor
Tibor Heffler (born 1987), Hungarian footballer

See also
Leffler